Poyle for Stanwell Moor Halt railway station was on the outskirts of London, on the now closed line of the Staines and West Drayton Railway.
   
It opened on 1 June 1927 to serve the village of Poyle; originally named Stanwell Moor and Poyle Halt, it was renamed Poyle for Stanwell Moor Halt on 26 September the same year. It closed on 29 March 1965, when passenger services on the line ceased. The line north of Colnbrook remains open for goods services. The M25 runs near and over much of the branch south of the station. Part of the former route is involved in the Heathrow Airtrack proposal to connect Staines with Heathrow Airport.

The Staines-West Drayton route never attracted many passengers as the hoped-for growth at the villages of Colnbrook, Poyle and Yeoveney did not occur.

References 

Disused railway stations in Surrey
Railway stations in Great Britain opened in 1927
Railway stations in Great Britain closed in 1965
Former Great Western Railway stations
Beeching closures in England
1927 establishments in England
1965 disestablishments in England
Borough of Spelthorne